Pablo Quintanilla (born 10 December 1986) is a Chilean motorcycle racer who specializes in enduro and rally raid, and a member of the Monster Energy Honda Team. He is one of the most outstanding Chilean rally raid riders in history, along with Carlo de Gavardo, Chaleco López and Ignacio Casale, having won the FIM Cross-Country Rallies World Championship in 2016 and 2017.

References

1986 births
Living people
Sportspeople from Valparaíso
Enduro riders
Chilean motorcycle racers
Dakar Rally motorcyclists
Off-road motorcycle racers